Eupanacra pulchella is a moth of the  family Sphingidae. It is known from Papua New Guinea.

It is similar to Eupanacra micholitzi. Adults have a dark forewing upperside with yellow stripes and an orange hindwing upperside with a dark marginal band. There is a conspicuous discal spot on the forewing underside. The hindwing underside has a pale red inner margin.

References

Eupanacra
Moths described in 1907